Nyla Jane Carroll (born 24 November 1965 in New Plymouth, Taranaki) is a retired long-distance runner from New Zealand, who represented her native country in the women's 10,000 metres at the 1996 Summer Olympics in Atlanta, United States. Carroll was also a member of the Kiwi team at the 1994 Commonwealth Games in Victoria, British Columbia, Canada, where she ended up in fifth place in the women's marathon race.

Achievements
All results regarding marathon, unless stated otherwise

External links
 New Zealand Olympic Committee 
 
 
 

1965 births
Living people
New Zealand female long-distance runners
Athletes (track and field) at the 1996 Summer Olympics
Athletes (track and field) at the 1994 Commonwealth Games
Olympic athletes of New Zealand
Sportspeople from New Plymouth
New Zealand female marathon runners
Commonwealth Games competitors for New Zealand